Sport Ireland, formerly the Irish Sports Council, is a statutory authority that oversees, and partly funds, the development of sport within Ireland. It is located at the National Sports Campus in the townland of Sheephill near Abbotstown House in Dublin.

Sport Ireland was established in July 1999 under powers provided by the Irish Sports Council Act. Its remit is to plan, lead and co-ordinate the sustainable development of competitive and recreational sport in Ireland.

Sport Ireland comprises eight major divisions including: Finance, High Performance, Local Sports Partnerships, National Governing Bodies, the Anti-Doping Unit, Corporate Services,  the National Trails Office, and the Irish Institute of Sport.

Sport Ireland is member of the European Platform for Sport Innovation.

See also
 Olympic Federation of Ireland

References

External links
Official website

1999 establishments in Ireland
 
State-sponsored bodies of the Republic of Ireland
Department of Tourism, Culture, Arts, Gaeltacht, Sport and Media